Isopogon trilobus, commonly known as barrel coneflower, is a species of flowering plant in the family Proteaceae and is endemic to South Coast Western Australia. It is a shrub with wedge-shaped leaves with lobed or toothed leaves, and oval, spherical or barrel-shaped heads of cream-coloured to yellow flowers.

Description
The new stems are pale to reddish brown, and initially covered with small fine hairs before becoming smooth.

Taxonomy
Isopogon trilobus was first formally described in 1810 by botanist Robert Brown in Transactions of the Linnean Society. Isopogon tripartitus R.Br., that Brown described in 1830 in the Supplementum to his Prodromus Florae Novae Hollandiae et Insulae Van Diemen, is now considered a synonym of the older name.
The specific epithet (trilobus) is derived from the Latin tri- "three", and lobus "lobe", and relates to the leaves. The epithet tripartitus means "divided into three parts".

Distribution and habitat
Barrel coneflower is widespread from the Stirling Range east to Israelite Bay along the south coast of Western Australia where it grows on sandplains, dunes or rocky outcrops, on sandy soils, sometimes over laterite, in heathland or shrubland communities.

Ecology
The colletid bee Hylaeus sanguinipictus and halictid bee Lasioglossum caesium have been recorded visiting the flowerheads of Isopogon trilobus.

Use in horticulture
Sensitive to Phytophthora cinnamomi dieback, I. trilobus requires excellent drainage and full sun. It will likely not tolerate humid climates. Grafting onto eastern species such as  I.anethifolius or  I.dawsonii could render it more adaptable to a wider climatic range. Its dense habit and large fruit give it its horticultural potential.

References

trilobus
Eudicots of Western Australia
Endemic flora of Western Australia
Taxa named by Robert Brown (botanist, born 1773)
Plants described in 1810